Troublesome Night 3 is a 1998 Hong Kong horror comedy film produced by Nam Yin and directed by Herman Yau. It is the third of the 20 films in the Troublesome Night film series.

Plot
The film consists of three loosely connected segments based on the central theme of a mortuary. Shishedo, a mortician, is grief-stricken when his favourite singer, Lam Wing-si, is killed in a car accident. Lam's face was badly marred so Shishedo takes her place in the coffin by disguising himself as the deceased singer. He disappears and leaves his colleagues to deal with the ghostly aftermath. In the next segment, Gigi wants a memorial service for her mother, who had hanged herself. The ghost of Gigi's mother is displeased when the greedy morticians try to trick her daughter into using their services so she haunts them. The last segment involves Hung, a mortician, who commits suicide after her boyfriend dumps her because of her job. Her boyfriend faces retribution when her ghost returns to haunt him and he dies after being stabbed to death by muggers.

Cast
 Louis Koo as Cheng Lik
 Vincent Kok as policeman
 Lee Kin-yan as Man
 Lee Lik-chi as Bill Chan
 Helen Poon as Mrs Wong
 Simon Lui as Chan Tai-cheung
 Fennie Yuen as Hung
 Rain Lau as Ann
 Allen Ting as Shishedo
 Frankie Ng as Sun Kwai
 Emotion Cheung as Trump
 Chin Kar-lok as Rock
 Natalie Wong as Elaine
 Michael Tse as Daviv
 Wallis Pang as Beauty Chan's sister
 Shing Fui-On as loanshark
 Law Lan as Gigi's mother
 Christine Ng as Gigi Cheung
 Vicky Hung as Daviv's new girlfriend
 Oliveiro Lana as Beauty Chan
 Lo Mang

External links
 
 

1998 films
1990s comedy horror films
Hong Kong comedy horror films
1990s Cantonese-language films
1998 horror films
Troublesome Night (film series)
1998 comedy films
1990s Hong Kong films